Brown bat may refer to:

Little brown bat, Myotis lucifugus, one of the most common bats of North America 
Big brown bat, Eptesicus fuscus, native to North America, Central America, the Caribbean, and extreme northern South America
Argentine brown bat, (Eptesicus furinalis), a bat species from South and Central America.
Brown tent-making bat, (Uroderma magnirostrum), a bat species from South and Central America.

Former disambiguation pages converted to set index articles